Dixella martinii is a species of fly in the family Dixidae. It is found in the  Palearctic .

References

Dixidae
Insects described in 1934
Nematoceran flies of Europe